Confrontation is an American literary magazine founded in 1968 and based at Long Island University in Brookville, New York.  It publishes fiction, essays and poetry twice each year.  The journal, edited from its inception to 2010 by LIU Post English professor and poet Martin Tucker, helped launch the careers of Cynthia Ozick, Paul Theroux and Walter Abish.

Work that has appeared in Confrontation has been short-listed for the Pushcart Prize and The Best American Short Stories.

Notable contributors 

W.H. Auden
John Steinbeck
Derek Walcott
Isaac Bashevis Singer
Joseph Brodsky
Nadine Gordimer
S.Y. Agnon
Arthur Miller

Ned Rorem
Ed Bullins
Joyce Carol Oates
T.C. Boyle
Lanford Wilson
Richard Burgin
Dan O'Brien
Jacob Appel

See also
List of literary magazines

References

External links
 Confrontation Magazine Official Site

Literary magazines published in the United States
Long Island University
Magazines established in 1968
Magazines published in New York (state)